Thiagarajar College is an autonomous government-aided college located in Madurai, Tamil Nadu, India. It is affiliated with Madurai Kamaraj University and is ranked 22nd among colleges in India by the National Institutional Ranking Framework.

Location
It is located on Kamarajar road, opposite of Mariamman Temple pond, Vandiyur.

History 
The college was established in 1949 by Kalaithanthai Karumuttu Thiagarajan Chettiar, a 20th-century South Indian philanthropist. The college was formally declared open by the Maharaja of Bhavnagar, the then Governor of Madras, on 12 October, 1949. Its mission is to provide quality higher education to the rural masses to realize the vision of Mahatma Gandhi. The college was originally affiliated to the Madras University, for undergraduate degrees in arts and science streams.

Academics 
The college currently provides 9 Ph.D., 11 M.Phil., 15 post-graduates, 24 undergraduates, 11 diploma and 13 certificate, educational programmes affiliated with Madurai Kamaraj University. The college is currently managed by the Kalaithanthai Karumuttu Thiagarajan Chettiar Memorial Trust.

References

External links
Official website

Educational institutions established in 1949
1949 establishments in India
Colleges in Madurai
Colleges affiliated to Madurai Kamaraj University
Universities and colleges in Madurai
Academic institutions formerly affiliated with the University of Madras